Wellstream Holdings plc is a British company which designs and manufactures flexible pipeline systems for the oil and gas industry. It is listed on the London Stock Exchange and was a constituent of the FTSE 250 Index before being acquired by General Electric in February 2011.

History
The company was founded in Panama City, Florida in 1983 as a supplier of equipment to offshore developers. Wellstream was acquired by Dresser Industries in 1995 and subsequently became part of Halliburton when it merged with Dresser in 1998. Halliburton sold off Wellstream to a Candover-led consortium for $136 million in 2003, which in turn listed the firm on the London Stock Exchange in April 2007. Candover remained Wellstream's largest shareholder with an approximate 14% stake until April 2008, when the block of shares was put up for sale in its entirety.

General Electric agreed to buy the company in December 2010, shortly after GE had agreed to buy Dresser.

Operations
The company is based in Newcastle upon Tyne, with major manufacturing facilities also located in Panama City, Florida, USA and Niterói, Brazil.

See also
 List of oilfield service companies

References

External links
Official site

Engineering companies of the United Kingdom
Manufacturing companies established in 1983
Manufacturing companies based in Newcastle upon Tyne
General Electric acquisitions
1983 establishments in Florida